Rahim Yar Khan Tehsil is an administrative subdivision (tehsil) of Rahim Yar Khan District in the Punjab province of Pakistan.

References

Rahim Yar Khan District
Tehsils of Punjab, Pakistan